Square Pond may refer to:

 Square Pond, a lake in York County, Maine
 An early name (circa 1800s) for Crystal Lake, Connecticut